1735 ITA is a carbonaceous asteroid from the outer region of the asteroid belt, approximately 62 kilometers in diameter. It was discovered on 10 September 1948, by Soviet–Russian astronomer Pelageya Shajn at the Simeiz Observatory located on the Crimean peninsula. It was named for the Institute for Theoretical Astronomy (ITA) in what is now Saint Petersburg, Russia.

Classification and orbit 

ITA orbits the Sun in the outer main-belt at a distance of 2.7–3.5 AU once every 5 years and 7 months (2,030 days). Its orbit has an eccentricity of 0.13 and an inclination of 16° with respect to the ecliptic.

Physical characteristics 

ITA has been characterized as a carbonaceous C-type asteroid.

Lightcurves 

In November 2004, a rotational lightcurve was obtained by French amateur astronomer René Roy, gave a rotation period of 12.599 hours with a brightness variation of 0.27 magnitude. In March 2007, astronomers Laurent Brunetto and Jean-Gabriel Bosch derived a concurring period of 12.6 hours with and amplitude of 0.40 magnitude A 2016-published light-curve from the Lowell Photometric Database gave a period of 12.6103 hours.

Diameter and albedo 

According to the surveys carried out by the Infrared Astronomical Satellite IRAS, the Japanese Akari satellite, and NASA's Wide-field Infrared Survey Explorer with its subsequent NEOWISE mission, ITA measures between 61.87 and 66.09 kilometers in diameter, and its surface has an albedo between 0.051 and 0.079. The Collaborative Asteroid Lightcurve Link derives an albedo of 0.0461 and a diameter of 61.93 kilometers with an absolute magnitude of 10.0.

Between 2009 and 2023, 1735 ITA has been observed to occult four stars.

Naming 

This minor planet was named in 1979, on the occasion of the 60th anniversary of the founding of the USSR Academy of Sciences Institute for Theoretical Astronomy (ITA), in what was then Leningrad. The official naming citation was published by the Minor Planet Center on 1 June 1980.

References

External links 
 Asteroid Lightcurve Database (LCDB), query form (info )
 Dictionary of Minor Planet Names, Google books
 Asteroids and comets rotation curves, CdR – Observatoire de Genève, Raoul Behrend
 Discovery Circumstances: Numbered Minor Planets (1)-(5000) – Minor Planet Center
 
 

001735
Discoveries by Pelageya Shajn
Named minor planets
19480910